Sukomal Barua (born 1955) is a Bangladeshi educationist. He is a Professor in the Department of Pali and Buddhist Studies at University of Dhaka. He has been awarded the prestigious Ekushey Padak in 2006 by the Government of Bangladesh for his contribution to education. He is a member of advisory council in Bangladesh Nationalist Party.

Early life 
Barua was born in 1955 in Dhemsha Union, Satkania Upazila, Chittagong District to Ganash Chandra Barua and Buddhimati Barua.

Career
Barua first worked at Rangunia College as a lecturer. Later he worked at Hasina Jamal Degree College where he was the first principal. He then joined University of Dhaka as a professor of the Department of Pali and Buddhist Studies. He became chairman of Department of Pali and Buddhist Studies in University of Dhaka. He is an adjunct professor of Atish Dipankar University of Science and Technology.

Barua served as the secretary general of "Religions for Peace Bangladesh". He was in central committee of the organization named "Asian Conference of Religions for Peace". He was first principal of Dhaka International Buddhist Monastery. He served as the president of the Gurudwara Management Committee Bangladesh and Dr. Ambedkar Foundation. He was vice-president of the Bangladesh Interreligious Writers and Journalists Association, and the Bangladesh chapter of the Asian Buddhist Conference for Peace.

He is President of the Bangladesh Chapter of World Buddhist Federation and Chairman of Council for Interfaith Hermony in Bangladesh.

Personal life
Barua has a daughter, Sanghamitra Barua Manosi. She introduced Sukomal Barua Gold Medal at University of Dhaka. She formed a trust fund of four lakh taka in 2014. The money is given to the students of Pali and Buddhist Studies from Dhaka University who are awarded gold medals annually. In 2017, the size of this fund stood at 10 lakh taka.

Bibliography

References

External link
 Sukomal Barua on University of Dhaka

1955 births
Living people
Bangladeshi Buddhists
People from Satkania Upazila
Academic staff of the University of Dhaka
Bangladeshi educators
Recipients of the Ekushey Padak
Academic staff of Atish Dipankar University of Science and Technology